David O Horton (born 1939), is a male former international badminton player who competed for England.

Badminton career
Horton is a two times National champion, winning the English National Badminton Championships in the mixed doubles in 1967 with Jenny Horton and the men's doubles with Roger Mills. In addition he has won the 1965 & 1967 Irish Open, and four Scottish Open titles.

He represented England in the singles, doubles and mixed (winning a bronze medal in the men's doubles with Mills), at the 1966 British Empire and Commonwealth Games in Kingston, Jamaica.

He represented Essex at county level.

Personal life
He married fellow international player Jenny Pritchard in 1965.

References

English male badminton players
1939 births
Living people
Badminton players at the 1966 British Empire and Commonwealth Games
Commonwealth Games medallists in badminton
Commonwealth Games bronze medallists for England
Medallists at the 1966 British Empire and Commonwealth Games